Jowzan Rural District is a rural district (dehestan) in the Central District of Malayer County, Hamadan Province, Iran. At the 2006 census, its population was 8,324, in 2,198 families. The rural district has 12 villages.

The economy is based on livestock, handicrafts and agriculture. Jowzan rugs has been declared in the global markets. One of the major products of the rural district is grape and raisin grapes to be exported to domestic and foreign market. Raisin production in the rural district and surrounding areas of Malayer, makes the region's reputation in producing and exporting these products.

References 

Rural Districts of Hamadan Province
Malayer County